The Walworth Aloyco Tournament was a men's professional golf tournament played from 1969 to 1972 in the Rome area of Italy. The event was held the week after the Italian BP Open. The Italian Open was restarted in 1971 and was played the week before the Italian BP Open, so that the Walworth Aloyco was the last of three consecutive weekly tournaments played in Italy. In 1972 the Italian Open moved to an autumn date. The 1971 and 1972 tournaments were played in the same week as the Masters Tournament. The 1972 tournament was not part of the inaugural European Tour season.

Winners

References

Golf tournaments in Italy
Recurring sporting events established in 1969
Recurring sporting events disestablished in 1972